Sky Park Airport may refer to:

 Sky Park Airport in Red Hook, New York, United States (FAA: 46N)
 Dallas Bay Sky Park in Chattanooga, Tennessee, United States (FAA: 1A0)
 Sierra Sky Park Airport in Fresno, California, United States (FAA: E79)